Revocation is the fourth studio album by American technical death metal band Revocation, released on August 5, 2013 by Relapse Records.

The album entered the US Billboard 200 at #159. selling 2,500 copies in the first week

Track listing

Personnel 
Writing, performance and production credits are adapted from the album liner notes.

Revocation
 David Davidson – lead guitar, lead vocals, gang vocals on "Invidious"
 Dan Gargiulo – rhythm guitar, backing vocals, gang vocals on "Invidious"
 Brett Bamberger – bass, gang vocals on "Invidious"
 Phil Dubois-Coyne – drums, gang vocals on "Invidious"

Additional Musicians
 Peter Rutcho – gang vocals on "Invidious"
 Pat Faherty – gang vocals on "Invidious"

Production
 Revocation – production
 Peter Rutcho – production, recording, engineering, mixing

Artwork and design
 Orion Landau – design

Chart performance

References

External links 
 
 Deathless at Revocation's official website

2013 albums
Relapse Records albums
Revocation (band) albums